is a city located in Ibaraki Prefecture, Japan. , the city had an estimated population of 48,074 in 19,327 households and a population density of 129.2 persons per km². . The percentage of the population aged over 65 was 36.2%.

Geography
Hitachiōta is located in northeastern Ibaraki Prefecture, bordered by Fukushima Prefecture to the north. The city is long from north to south, and has the largest area of any municipality in Ibaraki prefecture. From the west, the Asakawa, Yamada, and Sato rivers flow in parallel to the south, and the villages and cultivated lands are spread in the valleys along each river. The rivers all join the Kuji River, which runs through the southern border of the city.

Surrounding municipalities
Ibaraki Prefecture
 Takahagi
 Hitachi
 Hitachiōmiya
 Naka
 Daigo
Fukushima Prefecture
Yamatsuri
Hanawa

Climate
Hitachiōta has a Humid continental climate (Köppen Cfa) characterized by warm summers and cold winters with heavy snowfall.  The average annual temperature in Hitachiōta is 13.9 °C. The average annual rainfall is 1426 mm with September as the wettest month. The temperatures are highest on average in August, at around 25.2 °C, and lowest in January, at around 3.6 °C.

Demographics
Per Japanese census data, the population of Hitachiōta peaked in the 1950s and has declined since.

History
The town of Ōta was established with the creation of the modern municipalities system on April 1, 1889. It was raised to city status on July 15, 1954.　On December 1, 2004, the town of Kanasagō, and the villages of Satomi and Suifu (all from Kuji District) were merged into Hitachiōta, more than tripling its size and increasing its population by about 20,000.

Government
Hitachiōta has a mayor-council form of government with a directly elected mayor and a unicameral city council of 18 members. Hitachiōta contributes two members to the Ibaraki Prefectural Assembly. In terms of national politics, the city is part of Ibaraki 4th district of the lower house of the Diet of Japan.

Economy
The economy of Hitachiōta is primarily agricultural.

Education
Hitachiōta has 12 public elementary schools and five public middle schools operated by the city government, and three public high schools operated by the Ibaraki Prefectural Board of Education.

Transportation

Railway
 JR East –  Suigun Line
  -  -

Highway
  – Hitachi-minamiōta Interchange

Sister City relations
 - La Trinidad, Benguet, Philippines, sister city
 - Yuyao, Zhejiang, China, Friendship city
 - Hunchun, Yanbian Korean Autonomous Prefecture, Jilin, China, Friendship city

Local attractions
Bontenyama Kofun cluster
site of Ota Castle
Satake-dera
Seizan-so, National Historic Monument

Notable people from Hitachiōta 
Miyuki Akiyama, professional volleyball player
Hiroshi Kajiyama, politician

References

External links

Official Website 

 
Cities in Ibaraki Prefecture